The 2006 Espirito Santo Trophy took place 18–21 October at De Zalze Golf Club and Stellenbosch Golf Club in Stellenbosch in the Western Cape province of South Africa.

It was the 22nd women's golf World Amateur Team Championship for the Espirito Santo Trophy.

The tournament was a 72-hole stroke play team event. There were 42 team entries, each with two or three players.

For the first time since the inaugural edition, there were team entries representing each of the countries England, Scotland and Wales and a combined team representing the Republic of Ireland and Northern Ireland. In former championships, a combined team have represented Great Britain and Ireland.

Each team played two rounds at De Zalze Golf Club and two rounds at Stellenbosch Golf Club in different orders, but all the leading teams played the fourth round at De Zalze. The best two scores for each round counted towards the team total.

The team of the hosting nation South Africa won the Trophy for their first title. Silver medalist and defending champions, team Sweden, had the same total score, but South Africa was declared the winner. The initial tiebreaker, the final round non-counting score of the respective teams, was equal, but the second criteria, the third round non-counting score, was in the favor of South Africa. Team Colombia took the bronze on third place one stroke back.

The individual title went to Caroline Westrup, Sweden, whose score of 8-under-par, 280, was two strokes ahead of Rikako Morita, Japan.

Teams 
42 teams entered the event and completed the competition. Each team had three players, except the team representing Croatia, which had only two players.

Results 

*South Africa was awarded the tiebreak, since their third player, Ashleigh Simon, had a lower score than Sweden's third player, Sofie Andersson, in the third round, 73 against 77. The initial tiebreaker, the final round non-counting score of the respective teams, was equal.Source:

Individual leaders 
There was no official recognition for the lowest individual scores.

References

External links
Record Book on International Golf Federation website

Espirito Santo Trophy
Golf tournaments in South Africa
Espirito Santo Trophy
Espirito Santo Trophy
Espirito Santo Trophy